Jutulstraumen Glacier is a large glacier in Queen Maud Land, Antarctica, about  long, draining northward to the Fimbul Ice Shelf between the Kirwan Escarpment, Borg Massif and Ahlmann Ridge on the west and the Sverdrup Mountains on the east. It was mapped by Norwegian cartographers from surveys and air photos by the Norwegian–British–Swedish Antarctic Expedition (1949–52) and air photos by the Norwegian expedition (1958–59) and named Jutulstraumen (the giant's stream). More specifically jutulen are troll-like figures from Norwegian folk tales. The ice stream reaches speeds of around 4 metres per day near the coast where it is heavily crevassed.

See also

 List of glaciers in the Antarctic
 List of Antarctic ice streams

References

Ice streams of Antarctica
Bodies of ice of Queen Maud Land
Princess Martha Coast